743 Naval Air Squadron (743 NAS) was a naval air squadron of the Royal Navy's Fleet Air Arm. It was active from 1943 to 1945 as a Telegraphist Air Gunner Training squadron, part of No.2 Telegraphist Air Gunner School based at R.N. Air Section Yarmouth, Nova Scotia, Canada.

History of 743 NAS

Telegraphist Air Gunner Training Squadron (1943 - 1945)
743 Naval Air Squadron formed at R.N. Air Section Yarmouth, Nova Scotia, Canada, as a Telegraphist Air Gunner Training Squadron, on the 1 March 1943. It was part of No.2 Telegraphist Air Gunner School, within the Royal Navy No.1 Naval Air Gunnery School (NAGS), which was under the British Commonwealth Air Training Plan.

The squadron was equipped with Swordfish II, Walrus II and Avro Anson aircraft.

All training ceased on the 19 March 1945 at R.N. Air Section Yarmouth and 743 NAS wound down. All of the squadron aircraft were moved and delivered to R.N. Air Section Dartmouth (HMS Seaborn), Nova Scotia, Canada and this was completed on the 30 March 1945, with 743 NAS disbanding at R.N. Air Section Yarmouth on the same date.

Aircraft flown

The squadron has flown a number of aircraft types:
Fairey Swordfish
Supermarine Walrus
Avro Anson

Fleet Air Arm Bases 
731 NAS operated from a single air base:
R.N. Air Section YARMOUTH (1 March 1943 - 30 March 1945)

References

Citations

Bibliography

700 series Fleet Air Arm squadrons
Military units and formations established in 1943
Military units and formations of the Royal Navy in World War II